The York Water Company is an investor-owned, public utility company operating in Pennsylvania, United States. It was founded in 1816 by a group of local business men concerned about fire protection. It is the oldest investor-owned utility in the US, and has the longest record of consecutive dividends since 1816.

The company, which serves an estimated population of 190,000 through approximately 66,000 service connections across 48 municipalities, has headquarters in York, Pennsylvania.

See also

 Outline of Pennsylvania
 Index of Pennsylvania-related articles

References

External links
 The York Water Company

York, Pennsylvania
American companies established in 1816
Water companies of the United States
Companies listed on the Nasdaq
1816 establishments in Pennsylvania